Guy Greavette (born 27 April 1960) is a Canadian weightlifter. He competed in the men's middle heavyweight event at the 1988 Summer Olympics.

References

External links
 

1960 births
Living people
Canadian male weightlifters
Olympic weightlifters of Canada
Weightlifters at the 1988 Summer Olympics
Sportspeople from New Westminster
Commonwealth Games medallists in weightlifting
Commonwealth Games silver medallists for Canada
Commonwealth Games bronze medallists for Canada
Pan American Games medalists in weightlifting
Pan American Games bronze medalists for Canada
Weightlifters at the 1987 Pan American Games
Weightlifters at the 1982 Commonwealth Games
Weightlifters at the 1986 Commonwealth Games
Weightlifters at the 1990 Commonwealth Games
20th-century Canadian people
21st-century Canadian people
Medallists at the 1982 Commonwealth Games
Medallists at the 1986 Commonwealth Games
Medallists at the 1990 Commonwealth Games